Tjensvoll Church is a parish church of the Church of Norway in Stavanger Municipality in Rogaland county, Norway. It is located in the Tjensvoll neighborhood in the borough of Hillevåg in the city of Stavanger. It is the church for the Tjensvoll parish which is part of the Stavanger domprosti (arch-deanery) in the Diocese of Stavanger. The red brick church was built in a fan-shaped design in 1978 using designs by the architects Per Faltinsen and Inger-Lise Faltinsen. The church seats about 300 people.

See also
List of churches in Rogaland

References

Churches in Stavanger
Brick churches in Norway
20th-century Church of Norway church buildings
Churches completed in 1978
1978 establishments in Norway